The 2004–05 Pakistan Premier League season was the inaugural season of Pakistan Premier League, top tier of Pakistani football. The season started on 28 May 2004 and concluded on 13 October 2004.

Formation
The league was created as a replacement for group stage based National championship. The new PFF president, Makhdoom Syed Faisal Saleh Hayat, decided that it was time for Pakistan to have a football league. He felt that past presidents had neglected domestic football, and as a result, the national team suffered. A good example of this was the fact that national champions rarely played in AFC club competitions, and the Pakistan national team was one of the worst in the world.

The new PFF president, Makhdoom Syed Faisal Saleh Hayat, decided that it was time for Pakistan to have a football league. He felt that past presidents had neglected domestic football, and as a result, the national team suffered. A good example of this was the fact that national champions rarely played in AFC club competitions, and the Pakistan national team was one of the worst in the world.

This would have been the first time since 1948, when the first domestic football tournament was played, that a league system would be used to find a national champion.

Teams

Eight teams automatically qualified for the league from previous season's PFF Cup. Following teams earned automatic qualification:
 Allied Bank
 Habib Bank
 Karachi Port Trust
 Khan Research Laboratories
 Pakistan Army
 Pakistan Navy
 Pakistan Telecommunication
 WAPDA

Other eight teams qualified via regional tournament. Following are the teams qualified from regional tournament:
 Afghan Chaman
Baloch Quetta
 Mardan
 Mauripur Baloch
 Naka Muhammaden
 Panther
 Wohaib
 Young XI DIK

Season summary
Season started on 28 May 2004, Khuda Bakhsh of WAPDA was the first player to score a goal in new Pakistan Premier League when he scored a brace against Allied Bank.

The season saw many one-sided high-scoring matches, as some of the teams lacked in quality and financially. On 28 June, Habib Bank defeated Naka Muhammden 15–0, the highest scoring match and the biggest victory and loss and most numbers of player (7) scoring in a single match in the history of Pakistan Premier League. 

During June, Allied Bank disbanded their team, after refusing to renew the contracts of seven players; but they were able restored their team and returned playing. Bankruptcy hit Naka Muhammadan who withdrew before their 14 July match, they did however returned to complete the season.

The season was dominated by Khan Research Laboratories, Pakistan Army and WAPDA, as they scored a combined goals of 294, each scoring 98 goals, highest ever in Pakistan Premier League. 

Due to fixture congestion, WAPDA had to play both their final two matches on the same day, which just happened to be against title rivals Pakistan Army and Khan Research Laboratories. WAPDA and Army drew 2-2, meaning Army were three points ahead at the top of the table, but both shared the same goal difference, and WAPDA still had one match to play.

It meant WAPDA needed to win to finish first, and their opponents, KRL, also needed to win to finish first. In this top of the table clash, it was WAPDA who were victorious, thrashing KRL 4–0 to win the title by a superior goal difference, and be crowned as the first winners of the Pakistan Football League.

Arif Mehmood of WAPDA took the honours as the league's top scorer, with over 20 goals.

At the end of the season, 6 teams were relegated and 2 promoted as league reduced to 12 teams for 2005 after the number of one sided matches. Panther Club escaped relegation thanks to the withdrawal of Allied Bank from the 2005–06 season. National Bank and Pakistan Public Work Department were promoted to the 2005–06 season.

WAPDA represented Pakistan at the 2005 AFC President's Cup by virtue of being the national champions.

WAPDA, Pakistan Army and KRL set a new national record of 98 goals in a season. WAPDA only conceding 12 goals is also a new record.

League table

Statistics

Top scorers

Hat-tricks

4 Player scored 4 goals5 Player scored 5 goals.

References

External links
 RSSSF Pakistan Premier League 2004-05

Pakistan Premier League seasons
1
Pakistan